Simone Mori may refer to:
 Simone Mori (cyclist)
 Simone Mori (voice actor)